Yengijeh may refer to various places in Iran:
 Yengijeh, Azarshahr, East Azerbaijan Province
 Yengijeh, Maragheh, East Azerbaijan Province
 Yengijeh, Hamadan
 Yengijeh, Kermanshah
 Yengijeh, Kurdistan
 Yengijeh, Razavi Khorasan
 Yengijeh, West Azerbaijan
 Yengijeh, Shahin Dezh, West Azerbaijan Province
 Yangijeh, Urmia, West Azerbaijan Province
 Yengijeh, Zanjan
 Yengijeh, Mahneshan, Zanjan Province

See also
 Yengejeh (disambiguation)
 Yenkejeh (disambiguation)